The  Nebraska lunar sample displays  are two commemorative plaques consisting of small fragments of Moon specimen brought back with the Apollo 11 and Apollo 17 lunar missions and given in the 1970s to the people of Nebraska by United States President Richard Nixon as goodwill gifts.

Description

Apollo 11

Apollo 17

History 

The Nebraska lunar sample displays are at the Ralph Mueller Planetarium of the University of Nebraska State Museum.

See also
 List of Apollo lunar sample displays

References

Further reading

External links

Stolen and missing moon rocks
Tourist attractions in Nebraska